The Central District of Tehran County is in Tehran province, Iran. At the National Census in 2006, its population was 7,796,431 in 2,291,668 households. The following census in 2011 counted 8,262,262 people in 2,629,653 households. At the latest census in 2016, the district had 8,699,284 inhabitants in 2,912,511 households.

Divisional detail
Central District is in green.

References 

Tehran County

Districts of Tehran Province

Populated places in Tehran Province

Populated places in Tehran County